Naitō, Naito or Naitou (written: 内藤) is a Japanese name, also transliterated as Naitoh or Nightow. Notable people with the surname include:

 , vice president of Lenovo's PC and Smart Devices business unit, known as the "Father of ThinkPad"
 , American businessman, civic leader and philanthropist
 , Japanese professional boxer
 , Japanese female volleyball player
 , Japanese professional shogi player
 , Japanese samurai
 , Japanese samurai
 , Japanese samurai
 , Japanese daimyo
 , Japanese samurai
 , Japanese hurler
 , Japanese photographer
 , Japanese daimyo
 , Japanese daimyo
 , Japanese samurai
 , Japanese voice actor
 , Japanese architect, engineer, and professor
 , Japanese photographer
, Japanese professional wrestler
 , Japanese historian
 , Japanese sculptor
 , Japanese manga artist
, Japanese racewalker
, Japanese footballer
, Japanese tennis player

Japanese-language surnames